Ensiforma is a genus of leaf beetles. The scientific name of the genus was first published in 1876.

References 

Galerucinae
Chrysomelidae genera
Beetles described in 1876
Taxa named by Martin Jacoby